Mamestra curialis, the scripted arches, is a moth in the family Noctuidae (owlet moths) described by John Bernhard Smith in 1887. It is found in North America.

The MONA or Hodges number for Mamestra curialis is 10272.

References

Further reading
Arnett, Ross H. (2000). American Insects: A Handbook of the Insects of America North of Mexico. CRC Press.
Lafontaine, J. Donald, & Schmidt, B. Christian (2010). "Annotated check list of the Noctuoidea (Insecta, Lepidoptera) of North America north of Mexico". ZooKeys, vol. 40, 1-239.

External links
Butterflies and Moths of North America

Noctuinae